Cuthbert Rayne or Reyne or Raine was an English huntsman who served James VI of Scotland. James VI employed several English hunters and kennelmen who organised his field sports and looked after his dogs, including "Robert the English hunter", Cuthbert Armourer, Edward Dodsworth, and Cuthbert Rayne. In 1582, new kennels were built at Holyrood Palace for dogs brought to James by an English huntsman, Nicholas Poorhouse.

Background 
Cuthbert Rayne's family lived at Marwood near Barnard Castle in Teesdale. A younger namesake cousin, Cuthbert Reyne, was a Catholic, and joined the English College in Rome in 1613. He wrote of his cousin, a son of Nicholas Reyne who lived at "Rogermy" (Roger Moor, at Marwood), that he was "in high favour with the King, for when Elizabeth was yet reigning, he used every year to visit Scotland and go to the King for the sake of hunting".

Some huntsmen and bucks were sent to James VI in August 1586 by the English ambassador Thomas Randolph, who was at Newcastle, and the Scottish ambassador in London, Archibald Douglas. Randolph wrote:I have sent the Kynge two hunting men, verie good and skillful, with one footman, that can hoop, hollow and crye, that all the trees in Fawkland will quake for fear. Pray the Kynge's Majestie to be mercifull to the poor bucks; but let him spare and look well to himself.

Cuthbert Armourer 
One "Cuthbert the hunter", either Cuthbert Armourer or Cuthbert Rayne, was given a reward of 20 French crowns in 1588. George Young made this payment, while Richard Cockburn gave 200 crowns to English hunters. Archibald Arnot in Falkland was paid £80 Scots towards feeding English huntsmen. In 1589 another 20 crowns was paid to an English hunter.

Cuthbert Armourer was an exile with Jane Howard, Countess of Westmorland after the Rising of the North in 1569, and came to Ferniehirst Castle. He was active in Scotland as one of the king's huntsman before April 1583 when the English ambassador Robert Bowes reported that his hunting had "well pleased" James VI, while he supplied useful intelligence to the diplomat.

In August 1584, Armourer, a servant or tenant of Lord Hunsdon, attended a border meeting at Foulden with the Scottish huntsman John Hume of Manderston. Armourer became so close to the king, according to the Master of Gray, that James wept with "Cuddy Armerer" over the rumours that David Rizzio was his father. He carried letters and was a mediator with the discourted James Stewart, Earl of Arran. In December 1592 Arran came to Holyroodhouse and met James VI at the kennels.

James VI became suspicious in January 1593 that Cuthbert Armourer and Thomas Musgrave and other Northumbrians harboured his rebel Francis Stewart, 5th Earl of Bothwell, with the encouragement of Elizabeth I. The English ambassador assured him that he was misled by tale tellers. For a time, James VI continued to insist on the punishment and rendition of "Cuddye Armour" and Thomas Musgrave. Armourer was forgiven by December 1593 and he was employed by the Governor of Berwick to carry messages to Edinburgh. Eventually, after the Union of the Crowns, Cuthbert Armourer was granted the office of Chief Steward of Hexham.

Cuthbert Rayne and the export of deer 
In April 1592 the English ambassador in Scotland Robert Bowes decided to ask Cuthbert Rayne to help him organise a gift of deer for James VI, to be sent to stock the park at Falkland Palace. Bowes obtained warrants for deer from the English keepers from Elizabeth I. It would be the queen's gift to James VI. Rayne, who was evidently a member of the gentry, went to London and met William Cecil then travelled north to meet Bowes. They planned to visit Barnard Castle, Raby Castle, and Brancepeth Castle to capture seventy deer. Bowes was urgently requested to return to Scotland, leaving Rayne in charge.

At the end of May, Cuthbert Rayne had caught 21 male deer. However they had been hurt by the nets and the "buck stawles" used by Rayne's men. They were also injured by the dogs chasing them into the nets. Six were loaded into a Scottish boat hired by Bowes waiting at Sunderland, and shipped to Kirkcaldy for Falkland. Bowes anticipated and was told by the king's courtier Roger Aston that James VI would be very disappointed by their results. The difficulty was partly from the use of "buck staulls" to restrain the deer, borrowed from the Earl of Derby which were suitable only for red deer, not for fallow. Bowes wondered if another gentlemen might supervise any further attempts.

James Hudson brought 28 live deer to Scotland in April 1597 and James VI made a trip to Leith to see them. The deer were taken to Falkland in carts.

Rayne and Dodsworth 
In August 1594 James VI requested that the governor of Berwick-upon-Tweed allow Cuthbert Rayne and another English huntsman Edward Dodsworth to cross the border. He was surprised they had been hindered, as he thought the governor "lovit the game your selfe sum tymes". This incident accords with the description given by his cousin in 1613, that Rayne visited Scotland in the hunting season. His companion, Edward Dodsworth from Chevington or Romaldkirk in Teesdale, died in 1630 and was buried at Warkworth, where his gravestone blazoned with three bugles recorded him as "huntsman to King James". His brother and nephews also served as royal huntsmen.

Robert Rayne, royal huntsman
In England, Robert Rayne was yeoman of the privy harriers and sergeant of the "old buck hounds" a pack transferred by James VI and I to the use of his son Henry Frederick, Prince of Wales. His appointment as a yeoman pricker of the privy harriers for life was confirmed in 1626 by Charles I. Robert Rayne worked with Walter Rayne, Cuthbert Armourer, and members of the Dodsworth family.

External links
 Tomb of Edward Dodsworth, St Lawrence, Warkworth. Andrew Curtis, Geograph

References

Court of James VI and I
16th-century English people
Sportspeople from County Durham
English hunters
People of Falkland Palace